Pseudephebe pubescens, also known as 'fine rock wool', is a temperate alpine lichen. It is a member of the genus Pseudephebe, a lichen group characterized by dense mats of brown to near-black "hairs".

Habitat
Pseudephebe pubescens is found specifically on acidic rocks or stony ground in temperate-alpine or sub-arctic regions. It has circumpolar sightings, being found from the Canadian territories, throughout the United States, and sometimes in alpine Mexico.

References

Parmeliaceae
Lichen species
Lichens described in 1753
Taxa named by Carl Linnaeus
Lichens of North America